Game Genie is a line of video game cheat cartridges originally designed by Codemasters, sold by Camerica and Galoob. The first device in the series was released in 1990 for the Nintendo Entertainment System, with subsequent devices released for the Super NES, Game Boy, Genesis, and Game Gear. All Game Genie devices temporarily modify game data, allowing the player to do things unintended by developers such as, depending on the game, cheating, manipulating various aspects of games, and accessing unused assets and functions. Five million units of the original Game Genie products were sold worldwide, and most video game console emulators feature Game Genie code support. Emulators that have Game Genie support also allow a near-unlimited number of codes to be entered whereas the actual products have an upper and lower limit, between three and six codes.

In 1993, Codemasters began development on a "Game Genie 2", with Galoob to market and distribute the device in North America, but no Game Genie devices were released for the fifth generation of consoles. Other companies have produced similar hacking devices such as the Code Breaker, Action Replay, and Game Shark. The Game Genie brand was later revived by the company Hyperkin, who released cheat systems for newer consoles.

Codemasters later implemented similar cheat systems in some of their later games post-Game Genie, such as TOCA Touring Car Championship and Colin McRae Rally.

Operation and design
The original Game Genie systems were pass-through devices that attached between a cartridge and the console. Upon starting the console, the player is presented with a menu to enter a series of characters, referred to as a "code", that reference addresses in the ROM of the cartridge. Each code contains an integer value that is read by the system in place of the data actually present on the cartridge.

Because the Game Genie patches the program code of a game, the codes are sometimes referred to as patch codes. These codes can have a variety of effects. Most published codes give the player some form of invulnerability, infinite ammunition, level skipping, or other modifications that allow the player to be more powerful than intended by the developers. In other cases, codes can make the game more difficult or even unlock game features that developers had scrapped and rendered unreachable in normal play.

The Game Genie was packaged with a booklet of codes that could be used across various games. However, this booklet became outdated as Galoob developed new codes and new games were released. In response to this, Galoob created a paid subscription service where subscribers would receive new code booklets quarterly. In addition, Galoob also ran advertisements in certain gaming publications, such as GamePro, that featured codes for newer games.

To create new codes, it is possible to enter random codes into a Game Genie. This evolutionary approach is equivalent to using random POKE operations. Usually, entering random codes will result in no noticeable change in the game or freezing the game and possibly corrupting save data, but a useful difference may appear in the game if this process is repeated many times. Once a useful code is discovered, making slight modifications to this code has a much higher probability of producing additional useful codes. With ROM files, emulators, and compilers for these games and systems, it has become possible to reverse engineer games to find specific ROM data to modify.  This information can be directly converted into Game Genie codes.

The Game Genie is covered by US Patent #5112051, "Interfacing device for a computer games system", filed May 30, 1990. This patent expired on May 30, 2010, according to current US patent law.

NES

The NES Game Genie attaches to the end of the NES cartridge, causing the cartridge to protrude from the console when fully inserted, making the depression impossible. Therefore, the Game Genie was designed in such a way that it did not need to be depressed in order to start the game. This design put even more stress on the LIF socket than standard game insertion, bending pins and eventually causing units to be unplayable without the Game Genie present.

The Game Genie's shape made it difficult to insert into a New-Style NES without applying excessive force. Galoob addressed this problem by creating an adapter with was offered to Game Genie owners for free. 

There also exists a version of the Game Genie for the Family Computer, distributed by Realtec and sold in areas where Famiclones were common.

Super NES

The Super NES edition is incompatible with certain games, such as Star Fox  and Super Mario RPG: Legend of the Seven Stars, as these games use pins that went unused in most games. It also has problems with the SNS-101, as only two codes can be used at a time. There are three known versions of the SNES Game Genie (v1, v1.1, v2). When comparing the PCBs of v1 and v2, v2 has much fewer components. All three versions look exactly the same on the outside, but when v1.1 is booted up, it will have dashes present before any code is entered. The only way to tell v1 and v2 apart is by opening the case and checking the PCB.

Game Boy

The Game Boy edition similarly has a slot for cartridges while itself needing to be inserted into the console's game slot. It has two face buttons for toggling codes on/off or to return to the code input screen. This edition also houses a compartment to contain a very small code booklet in the back.

The physical design made it difficult to be used with any version of the Game Boy other than the original. Although it could be made to work, if one attempted to use the Game Genie on the Game Boy Pocket, Game Boy Light, or Game Boy Advance, they would find the large top portion of the Game Genie would come into contact with the top of the handheld before it was fully engaged. Therefore, the Game Genie would need to be bent backwards in order to function, placing strain on the mechanism that allows it to be pressed down far enough to reach the cartridge contacts. Despite this history, it will work with the Game Boy Advance SP. A standard unit will not fit in a Super Game Boy, but with some minor modification to the plastic, it can fit and work normally. There was also a third party "Super Game Boy to Game Genie Adapter", allowing the player to connect the Game Genie to a Super Game Boy cartridge.

The unit is also not compatible with Game Boy Color or Game Boy Advance cartridges (which will not physically fit into the unit).

Sega Genesis

On the Genesis/Mega Drive, the Game Genie can function as a country converter cartridge since most of these games are only "locked" to their respective regions by the shape of the cartridges and/or a set of a few bytes in the header of the ROM. Some games do not work with the Genesis Game Genie. The unit is also not compatible with Sega 32X cartridges (see "legal issues" below).

Game Gear
The Game Gear version of the Game Genie had a more complicated design than those for other systems. When inserted into the cartridge slot, another slot would pop-up to insert the Game Gear cartridge. It also had a compartment which contained a book of codes. The codes were printed on sticky labels to put on the back of the Game Gear cartridge. When entering codes, the player could easily see what to type in rather than looking through the book.

In the code input menu for the Game Gear Game Genie, a player typing the word "DEAD" will cause the screen to move up and down, possibly as an Easter egg.

Again, some games do not work with this version of the Game Genie (see "legal issues" below).

Legal issues

The introduction of the original NES Game Genie was met by firm opposition from Nintendo. Nintendo sued Galoob in the case Galoob v. Nintendo, claiming that the Game Genie created derivative works in violation of copyright law. Sales of the Game Genie initially stopped in the U.S., but not in Canada. In many gaming magazines at the time, Galoob placed Game Genie ads saying "Thank You Canada!" After the courts found that use of the Game Genie did not result in a derivative work, Nintendo could do nothing to stop the Game Genie from being sold in the U.S.

Around the time of the lawsuit from Galoob, Nintendo tried to use other methods to thwart the Game Genie, using ROM checksum in later titles intended to detect the cheat modifications. These measures were partially successful but some could be bypassed with additional codes. Later versions of the Game Genie had the ability to hide Genie modifications from checksum routines.

Sega, on the other hand, was a full endorser of the Game Genie, with their official seal of approval.

Game Genie 2

A substantially more powerful device was developed by Codemasters for the Super NES, with many improvements including the ability for users to find their own cheat codes, to selectively activate cheats during gameplay using the game controller, to switch games into a slow-motion mode, as well as automatically save and restore the high-scores from games into battery-backed memory on the Game Genie device itself. A fully working prototype of the device was completed, but was not brought to market due to changes in market conditions. One prototype is known to remain in existence, in the possession of Richard Aplin, one of its original creators.

See also
 Action Replay
 Multiface
 ROM hacking
 Emergent gameplay
 GameShark

References

External links
Technical explanation of how Game Genie and its codes work
Game Genie Code Creators Club at Internet Archive
Codes at GameGenie.com

Nintendo Entertainment System accessories
Unlicensed Nintendo hardware
Cheating in video games
Emergent gameplay
1990s toys
Codemasters